Department of Premier and Cabinet or Department of the Premier and Cabinet is a department in each Australian state government.

Specific uses are:

Department of Premier and Cabinet (New South Wales)
Department of Premier and Cabinet (Victoria)
Department of Premier and Cabinet (Tasmania), in the Tasmanian Government
Department of the Premier and Cabinet (Queensland)
Department of the Premier and Cabinet (South Australia)
Department of the Premier and Cabinet (Western Australia)

See also
Department of the Prime Minister and Cabinet (Australia)